"I've Got a Picture of Us on My Mind" is a song written by Bobby Harden that was originally performed by American country music artist Loretta Lynn. It was released as a single in September 1979 via MCA Records.

Background and reception 
"I've Got a Picture of Us on My Mind" was recorded at the Bradley's Barn on March 9, 1979. Located in Mount Juliet, Tennessee, the session was produced by renowned country music producer Owen Bradley. Three additional tracks were recorded during this session.

"I Can't Feel You Anymore" reached number five on the Billboard Hot Country Singles survey in 1970. Additionally, the song peaked at number two on the Canadian RPM Country Songs chart during this same period. It was included on her studio album, Loretta (1979).

Track listings 
7" vinyl single
 "I've Got a Picture of Us on My Mind" – 2:45
 "I Don't Feel Like a Movie Tonight" – 2:56

Charts

References 

1979 songs
1979 singles
MCA Records singles
Loretta Lynn songs
Song recordings produced by Owen Bradley
Songs written by Bobby Harden